Mesiani is a village located in Servia municipality, Kozani regional unit, in the Greek region of Macedonia. It is situated at an altitude of 395 meters above sea level. The postal code is 50100, while the telephone code is +30 24610. At the 2011 census the population was 280. 

The regional capital, Kozani, is 15 km away.

References

Populated places in Kozani (regional unit)